Itzhak Drucker (born June 3, 1947) is a former Israeli football defender, who played for Israel national football team between 1966 and 1970. He took part in the 1968 Summer Olympics.

Biography
Drucker was born in Germany, but his parents immigrated to Israel in 1948. At age of eight, Drucker started his career with Hapoel Petah Tikva's junior club, and at age of seventeen he became as a player at the senior team. After six seasons at the club he left and moved to Shimshon Tel Aviv F.C. There he played for three years, then he played for Maccabi Petah Tikva F.C. for five years and then he became a member of Hapoel Kfar Saba F.C. for a season.

International career
Drucker made his international debut for Israel national under-19 football team in 1966. However, following his major score during that season, Milovan Ćirić, Israel's senior team manager, decided to add him into the senior squad. He took part in international games (1968 Summer Olympics and 1968 AFC Asian Cup,), but he did not take part in the 1970 FIFA World Cup. Drucker made 18 appearances for the Israel national football team since 1968 until he was expelled in 1970.

References

External links 
Profile of Itzhak Drucker on Hapoel Petah Tikva website

1947 births
Living people
Israeli footballers
Hapoel Petah Tikva F.C. players
Israeli Premier League players
German emigrants to Israel
1968 AFC Asian Cup players
Footballers at the 1968 Summer Olympics
Olympic footballers of Israel
Association football defenders